Notolabrus gymnogenis, commonly known as the crimson banded wrasse, is a species of fish in the family Labridae. This colourful fish is endemic to Eastern Australia.

Description
This species grows to ~40 cm, and is like many wrasses, its colour changes over different stages of its life. Juveniles are greenish brown with rows of white spots along the sides. Females are reddish to brownish-orange with rows of white spots along the sides. Males are brightly coloured with red dorsal and anal fins, a red band around the rear of the body, a white caudal peduncle and a yellow caudal fin.

Distribution
The fish is found in coastal waters of eastern Australia from Hervey Bay, Queensland to Lakes Entrance, Victoria and also in Tasmania. It has also been recorded from Lord Howe Island.

Behaviour
Males are territorial and will defend a territory against other males. The males gather a harem of around 10 females and juveniles into their territory. This is an oviparous fish which forms pairs to spawn.

Habitat
Notolabrus gymnogenis are benthic coastal reef inhabitants and are commonly found on reef in New South Wales.

Diet
Notolabrus gymnogenis feeds mostly on benthic invertebrates, the juveniles mostly prey on amphipods, while the larger individuals prey on decapods, gastropods and bivalves.

Human usage
Notolabrus gymnogenis is a quarry for recreational fishing and has also been recorded being sold commercially in the Sydney Fish market 2005.

References

gymnogenis
Marine fish of Eastern Australia
Fauna of New South Wales
Fish of Lord Howe Island
Fish described in 1862
Taxa named by Albert Günther